Orthogonius duplicatus is a species of ground beetle in the subfamily Orthogoniinae. It was described by Wiedemann in 1819.

References

duplicatus
Beetles described in 1819